Gavin McDonnell (born 30 March 1986) is a British professional boxer who has challenged twice for a world super-bantamweight title: the WBC title in 2017, and the WBA title in 2018. He is the twin brother of fellow boxer Jamie McDonnell.

Professional career 

McDonnell fought Leigh Wood for the vacant British Super-Bantamweight title in Hull on 22 February 2014. McDonnell won the vacant title by TKO in the 6th round. McDonnell's first defense of the British Super-Bantamweight title would come against Josh Wale on 21 May 2014. The contest went the distance of 12 rounds and ended in a split draw, with the judges scoring the contest 115–114 Wale, 115–114 McDonnell and the final judge scoring the bout at 114–114, meaning McDonnell would hold on to the belt.
 
His next fight came in the form of Vusi Malinga on 25 October 2014 in a contest for the vacant WBO International Super-Bantamweight title. McDonnell dominated the fight from start to finish and also sent Malinga down in the 8th round with a beautiful right hand. The contest went the distance with McDonnell winning by Unanimous Decision. After the win McDonnell was projected to 4th in the British Rankings for the Super-Bantamweight division.

On 16 June 2018, McDonnell outpointed Stuart Hall, 117–111, 117-111 and 115–113 to a unanimous decision victory and successfully defended his WBC regional title.

On 6 October 2018, McDonnell fought Daniel Roman for the WBA super-bantamweight world title. Roman was winning the fight, ultimately dropping McDonnell in the tenth. McDonnell managed to beat the count, but the referee decided to stop the fight.

Professional boxing record

References

External links
 
 Gavin McDonnell - Profile, News Archive & Current Rankings at Box.Live

1986 births
Living people
English male boxers
Super-bantamweight boxers